The Bobby Orr Trophy represents the Central Hockey League's highest individual defensive award. Previously recognized as the CHL Most Valuable Defenseman Award, beginning with the 1979–80 CHL season, the Bobby Orr Trophy was named in honour of the Hockey Hall of Fame defenceman.

List of winners

References

Central Professional Hockey League trophies and awards